"Don't Let the Sun Catch You Cryin'" is a song written by Joe Greene and released in 1946 by Louis Jordan And His Tympany Five. Jordan's version reached No. 3 in Billboard's chart of "Most-Played Juke Box Race Records".

The song was recorded by Ray Charles, and appeared in his 1959's album The Genius of Ray Charles. Charles's version reached No. 17 on Billboard's "Hot R&B Sides" and No. 95 on the Billboard Hot 100. It was also recorded by Jackie DeShannon on her 1965 album This is Jackie De Shannon, Paul McCartney on his 1990 live album Tripping the Live Fantastic, Jex Saarelaht and Kate Ceberano on their album Open the Door - Live at Mietta's (1992) and jazz singer Roseanna Vitro on her 1997 album Catchin’ Some Rays: The Music of Ray Charles. Karin Krog and Steve Kuhn include it on their 2005 album, Together Again. In 2016, Sony Music released a studio album never before heard outside of the studio by Jeff Buckley entitled "You and I (Jeff Buckley album)", on this album Jeff covers Don't Let the Sun Catch You Cryin' in his own style. 

Steve Alaimo released a version in 1963

See also
 Billboard Most-Played Race Records of 1946

References

1946 songs
Louis Jordan songs
Ray Charles songs
Songs written by Joe Greene (American songwriter)